Kanal 5 plus  is a privately owned satellite television channel in North Macedonia.

References

External links

Kanal 5 plus at LyngSat Address

Television channels in North Macedonia